A hui is a  New Zealand term for an assembly, gathering or meeting.

Originally from the Māori language, the word was used by Europeans as early as 1846 to refer to Māori gatherings, but is now increasingly used in New Zealand English to describe events that are not exclusively Māori.

See also
New Zealand culture

References

Māori words and phrases
Māori culture
Māori society